The 2004–05 AHL season was the 69th season of the American Hockey League. Twenty-eight teams played 80 games each in the schedule. The Rochester Americans finished first overall in the regular season. The Philadelphia Phantoms won the Calder Cup, defeating the Chicago Wolves in the finals.

This season featured a wealth of talent in the AHL, as the National Hockey League was in the midst of a lockout which would cause that league's 2004–05 season to be canceled on February 16, 2005.  Many players who otherwise may have been called up to be members of NHL teams for the season spent the full season in the AHL instead.  The lockout also provided opportunity for several NHL arenas — including those in Anaheim, Buffalo, Nashville, San Jose and Tampa — to host AHL games during the season.  The Edmonton Road Runners, meanwhile, played the entire season in Rexall Place, normally the home of the NHL's Edmonton Oilers.

In addition, the shootout (previously used in the 1986–87 season) was reintroduced to the league, to decide a winner in games which remained tied following the overtime period. The team winning a shootout was credited with a win, and the losing team with an overtime loss. 

The AHL also announced a series of experimental rule changes, most notably a restricted area for goaltenders.  Playing the puck outside the restricted area results in an automatic two-minute delay of game penalty.

Team changes
The Toronto Roadrunners moved to Edmonton, Alberta, becoming the Edmonton Road Runners.

Final standings
Note: GP = Games played; W = Wins; L = Losses; OTL = Overtime losses; SL = Shootout losses; GF = Goals for; GA = Goals against; Pts = Points;

Eastern Conference

Western Conference

Scoring leaders

Note: GP = Games played; G = Goals; A = Assists; Pts = Points; PIM = Penalty minutes

Leading goaltenders

Note: GP = Games played; Mins = Minutes Played; W = Wins; L = Losses: OTL = Overtime Losses; SL = Shootout Losses; GA = Goals Allowed; SO = Shutouts; GAA = Goals Against Average

Calder Cup Playoffs

All Star Classic
The 18th AHL All-Star Classic was played on February 14, 2005, at the Verizon Wireless Arena in Manchester, New Hampshire. Team PlanetUSA defeated team Canada 5-4 in a shootout win. In the skills competition held the night before, team PlanetUSA defeated team Canada 17-13.

Trophy and award winners

Team awards

Individual awards

Other awards

See also
List of AHL seasons

References
AHL official site
AHL Hall of Fame
HockeyDB

 
American Hockey League seasons
2
2